Girl is a 2023 British drama film written and directed by Adura Onashile in her feature debut. It premiered at the 2023 Sundance Film Festival. Filmed and set in Glasgow, Girl will open the Glasgow Film Festival.

Cast
 Déborah Lukumuena as Grace
 Le'Shantey Bonsu as Ama
 Danny Sapani
 Liana Turner

Production
Adura Onashile began developing Girl in 2017 with Rosie Crerar and Ciara Barry of the production company barry crerar. barry crerar also produced Onashile's short film Expensive Shit (2020). Girl was developed with iFeatures and BBC Film, and received support from the British Film Institute (BFI) and Screen Scotland.

The production team decided to search internationally when casting the lead character Grace and happened upon French actress Déborah Lukumuena. Le'Shantey Bonsu was scouted for the role of Ama through her primary school's drama programme in Leeds. Onashile incorporated elements from Lukumuena and Bonsu's backgrounds into the film. Also starring in the film are Danny Sapani and Liana Turner.

Principal photography took place in Glasgow over the course of six weeks and wrapped in October 2021.

References

External links
 

2020s British films
BBC Film films
British Film Institute films
Black British films
Films about immigration to Europe
Films about mother–daughter relationships
Films shot in Glasgow
Films set in Glasgow
Scottish drama films